The Virgo III Groups, or Virgo III Cloud, are a series of at least 75 galactic clusters and individual galaxies stretching approximately  off the eastern edge of the Virgo Supercluster. Parts of it are in the constellations Virgo, Libra, and Serpens Caput.

These clusters include:
NGC 5248 Group:
NGC 5248
UGC 8575
UGC 8614
NGC 5364 Group:
NGC 5300
NGC 5348
NGC 5356
NGC 5360
NGC 5363
NGC 5364
NGC 5506 Group:
IC 976
NGC 5496
NGC 5506
NGC 5507
UGC 9057
NGC 5566 Group:
NGC 5560
NGC 5566
NGC 5569
NGC 5574
NGC 5576
NGC 5577
UGC 9215
NGC 5638 Group:
IC 1024
NGC 5636
NGC 5638
NGC 5668
UGC 9310
UGC 9380
NGC 5746 Group:
NGC 5658
NGC 5690
NGC 5691
NGC 5692
NGC 5705
NGC 5713
NGC 5719
NGC 5725
NGC 5740
NGC 5746
NGC 5750
UGC 9299
UGC 9469
UGC 9482
NGC 5775 Group:
IC 1066
IC 1067
IC 1070
NGC 5770
NGC 5774
NGC 5775
NGC 5846 Group:
NGC 5813
NGC 5831
NGC 5846
NGC 5846A
NGC 5854
NGC 5864
NGC 5869
UGC 9746
UGC 9751
UGC 9760
Additional galaxies in the group:
IC 1014
NGC 5334
NGC 5470
NGC 5584
NGC 5645
NGC 5669
NGC 5701
NGC 5792
NGC 5806
NGC 5838
NGC 5921
UGC 9169
UGC 9500

See also
M96 Group
Leo II Groups
Virgo II Groups

References

Galaxy clusters
Virgo Supercluster